The National Democratic Party (NDP) is a political party in Namibia. It was formed in 1973 as the Ovamboland Independence Party (OIP) by Silas Ipumbu. It took the name NDP to contest the elections to the Ovambo Legislative Assembly, by then under the leadership of Cornelius Tuhafeni Ndjoba. The party's base was amongst the Ovambo people.

After being dormant for three decades the NDP contested in the 2015 local authority elections in the Zambezi Region but failed to gain a seat. In 2019 it contested the national assembly election and gathered 4,559 votes (0.6%), not enough to gain a seat in parliament.

References

Political parties in Namibia
Political parties established in 1973
1973 establishments in South West Africa
Ovambo